Romayleh (also Romanized as Romeyleh and Romeileh; also known as Ramlah and Ramleh) is a village in Moqam Rural District, Shibkaveh District, Bandar Lengeh County, Hormozgan Province, Iran. At the 2006 census, its population was 175, in 33 families.

References 

Populated places in Bandar Lengeh County